ESAE FC is a Beninese football club based in Sakété in the Plateau Department. They currently play in the Benin Premier League.

The club was previously known as Adjobi FC until 2015.

Stadium
The team plays at the 12,000 capacity Stade René Pleven d'Akpakpa.

Current squad
''Squad for the 2021–22 CAF Confederation Cup

Staff

References

External links
Soccerway
Sportsopera

Football clubs in Benin